Bergentrückung may refer to:

 Bergentrückung, a song by Toby Fox from the 2015 album Undertale Soundtrack
 , the German name for the King asleep in mountain motif